George Dutton (December 19, 1899 – May 13, 1977) was an American sound engineer. He was nominated for five Academy Awards; three in the category Best Effects and two for Sound Recording.

Selected filmography
Best Effects
 So Proudly We Hail! (1943)
 The Story of Dr. Wassell (1944)
 Unconquered (1947)

Best Sound
 Gunfight at the O.K. Corral (1957)
 Vertigo (1958)

References

External links

1899 births
1977 deaths
American audio engineers
Special effects people
People from Massachusetts
People from San Marcos, California
Engineers from California
20th-century American engineers